Revolutionary Armed Forces of the Sahara (FARS) is a Toubou militant group in Niger, presumably of separatist intentions, who kidnapped two Italian tourists in August 2006. Boubakar Mohamed Sogoma, ethnically Toubou, is a commander of FARS in 2008.

See also 
 Niger Movement for Justice
 Azawagh

References

External links 
 Minorities at Risk Assessment for Tuaregs in Niger
Rebel groups in Niger
Paramilitary organisations based in Niger
National liberation movements
Secessionist organizations
Tuareg